Kolana buccina is a butterfly in the family Lycaenidae. It was described by Druce in 1907. It is found in Brazil (Mato Grosso, Pará).

References

Butterflies described in 1907
Eumaeini
Taxa named by Hamilton Herbert Druce